Aki Cederberg (born in 1978) is a Finnish writer, musician and filmmaker. He has written books about Indian religions and European modern Paganism, including Journeys in the Kali Yuga (2017) and Pyhä Eurooppa (2020).

Early life
Aki Cederberg was born in Helsinki, Finland in 1978. He has a university degree in culture and arts. Interested in spiritual matters from an early age, he explored Western esotericism and the works of Aleister Crowley before moving into European modern Paganism, which he defines as having a mythopoetic view of the world. Because he wanted to connect to a living tradition, he began to make trips to India to meet gurus and explore Indian religious traditions. His first trip to India lasted for three months and he kept returning to the country during the next ten years.

Writing career
Cederberg has written for The Fenris Wolf, a series of anthologies from Edda Publishing. Experiences he had in Asia form the basis for his books Pyhiinvaellus. Matkalla Intiassa ja Nepalissa from 2013 and Journeys in the Kali Yuga: A Pilgrimage from Esoteric India to Pagan Europe, published in 2017. At the end of the latter book, Cederberg rejects universalism and spiritual exoticism and argues for Westerners to approach spirituality through the gods of their native traditions, in Cederberg's case paganism from the Nordic countries. Publishers Weekly called Journeys in the Kali Yuga a "visceral, evocative memoir" where the author acts as "neither guide nor guru, allowing readers to truly participate in his journey without worrying about what exactly they are supposed to learn".

Cederberg's next book, Pyhä Eurooppa, was published in 2020 and is a travelogue about places in Europe with a reputation of being holy. Cederberg uses this to argue that humans need a sense of sanctity and significance in life, which he contrasts with materialism and exploitation. The book discusses how European cultural and spiritual heritage has become associated with nationalist and far-right politics, something Cederberg renounces. A. W. Yrjänä of Helsingin Sanomat called the book "weirdly refreshing" because of its rejection of irony and direct call for spirituality.  of Turun Sanomat highlighted and complimented the book's argument about a human need to connect to previous generations, which both capitalism and the Soviet Union have been unable to fulfill.

Other work
Cederberg has been active as a musician and filmmaker. He has been a member of various music groups and made the film Taiwaskivi (2009) with the audovisiual group Halo Manash. He has worked as an assistant director on several Finnish feature films and made a making-of documentary about the film Christmas Story (2007).

In 2021, Cederberg launched the cultural magazine Porvoon Kipinä with himself as editor-in-chief. It has a special focus on spiritual and esoteric dimensions of culture and people associated with Porvoo.

Selected publications
 Pyhiinvaellus. Matkalla Intiassa ja Nepalissa, Salakirjat 2013
 Journeys in the Kali Yuga: A Pilgrimage from Esoteric India to Pagan Europe, Inner Traditions – Bear & Company 2017
 Pyhä Eurooppa,  2020

References

External links
 Personal website
 

1978 births
Living people
21st-century Finnish writers
Finnish non-fiction writers
Travel writers
Finnish modern pagans
Modern pagan writers
Writers from Helsinki
Magazine publishers (people)